Mimachrostia parafasciata is a moth of the family Erebidae first described by Michael Fibiger in 2008. It is known from Zhejiang and Jiangsu in eastern China.

Adults have been found in May and June, but probably occur in several generations.

The wingspan is 13.5–14 mm. The forewing is relatively narrow and light brown, with an often indistinct, narrow, beige reniform stigma. The antemedian and postmedian lines are well marked, waved and widened from the costa to the ventral margin. The subterminal line is weakly marked. The terminal line is marked by black interveinal spots. The hindwing is greyish brown with an indistinct discal spot.

References

Micronoctuini
Moths described in 2008